Silda Alice Wall Spitzer (born December 30, 1957) is an American businesswoman and lawyer who was the First Lady of New York from January 2007 until March 2008, when her then husband, Eliot Spitzer, was governor. She has worked in the private, nonprofit, and public sectors in the areas of green/sustainability issues, youth service/education, and human rights and women's financial and other empowerment. 

Currently, she is director and principal at NewWorld Capital Group, a private equity firm investing in environmental and energy-related products and services. She is also co-founder and CEO of woman-owned New York Makers, a digital magazine and marketplace covering New York State.

Early life
Born Silda Alice Wall, she grew up in Concord, the county seat of Cabarrus County in south-central North Carolina. Her father, Robert, was a hospital administrator, and her mother, Trilby, was a homemaker. She was raised as a Southern Baptist. She graduated summa cum laude from Meredith College in 1980 with a B.A. in English and history. She received a Juris Doctor from Harvard Law School in 1984.

Personal life
She married Eliot Spitzer on October 17, 1987, and had three daughters: Elyssa, Sarabeth, and Jenna. At the close of 2013, Wall and her husband announced the end of their marriage.

Career
Wall began her legal career with Skadden, Arps, Slate, Meagher & Flom, specializing in mergers, acquisitions and corporate finance. She next joined The Chase Manhattan Bank, N.A. as a member of its international legal group. She is a founding co-chair of Project Cicero, the annual New York City book drive that builds classroom libraries in under-resourced schools. She served on the New York Blue Ribbon Commission on Youth Leadership and the board of the Children's Museum of Manhattan from 1995 until January 1999, where she was a member of its executive committee and chaired its program committee.

In 1996, she co-founded Children for Children, a not-for-profit organization, to engage children from an early age in volunteering and service. She served as its president and chair until 2007. CFC has become the youth service division of Points of Light and is now called generationOn.

As the wife of former New York Governor Eliot Spitzer, she was the First Lady of New York from January 2007 until March 2008. From 2008 to 2011, she was managing director at Metropolitan Capital Advisors, a woman-owned hedge fund.

Currently, she is director and principal at NewWorld Capital Group, a private equity firm investing in growth equity and infrastructure project finance environmental opportunities, including energy efficiency, clean energy, water, waste-to-value, and environmental products and services. She is also co-founder and CEO of a woman-owned New York Makers, a digital magazine and marketplace covering New York State.

Among her not-for-profit activities, Spitzer serves as the vice-chairperson of Urban Green Council, is on the Ceres president's council, and the Sustainable Endowment Institute's advisory board. She also served on the boards of Points of Light and generation until 2015. She is a board member at Meredith College and the Center for Law, Brain, and Behavior, and is an honorary trustee of No Bully.

Honors
She was awarded an honorary doctorate from Meredith College in 2012.

Further reading
Paterson, David "Black, Blind, & In Charge: A Story of Visionary Leadership and Overcoming Adversity." New York, New York, 2020

References

External links

Silda Wall Spitzer bio – NewWorld Capital Group

1957 births
American investment bankers
American women lawyers
Baptists from North Carolina
Businesspeople from New York City
Corporate lawyers
Eliot Spitzer
First ladies and gentlemen of New York (state)
Harvard Law School alumni
JPMorgan Chase people
Lawyers from New York City
Living people
Meredith College alumni
New York (state) lawyers
People from Concord, North Carolina
People from Chapel Hill, North Carolina
Skadden, Arps, Slate, Meagher & Flom people
Baptists from New York (state)